Matthew Liard (1736-1782) was an English engraver. His work is held in the collection of the Cooper-Hewitt, National Design Museum.

References

1736 births
1782 deaths
English engravers
18th-century engravers